The 1998 United States Senate election in Alaska was held November 3, 1998. Incumbent Republican United States Senator Frank Murkowski sought re-election to a fourth term in the United States Senate. Murkowski easily won re-election against Democratic nominee Joseph Sonneman, a perennial candidate, earning nearly 75% of the vote.

Open primary

Candidates

Democratic 
 Joseph Sonneman, perennial candidate
 Frank Vondersaar, perennial candidate

Republican 
 Frank Murkowski, incumbent United States Senator since 1981
 William L. Hale

Green 
 Mary Jordan

Libertarian 
 Scott A. Kohlhaas, perennial candidate

Results

General election

Results

See also 
 1998 United States Senate elections

References 

United States Senate
Alaska
1998